Adam's Rib is a 1949 film starring Spencer Tracy and Katharine Hepburn.  

Adam's Rib can also refer to:

 A reference to the biblical story of Adam and Eve
 Adam's Rib (1923 film), a 1923 film directed by Cecil B. DeMille
 Adam's Rib (1990 film), a 1990 Soviet film
 Adam's Rib (album), a 1998 album by Canadian musician Melanie Doane, and the title track
 Adam's Rib (TV series), a short-lived 1973 sitcom based from the 1949 film
 Adam's Rib Ski Area, a proposed ski resort in Eagle County, Colorado, USA

See also
 "Adam's Ribs", a 1974 episode of M*A*S*H
 "Adam's Ribs" (song), a 1993 single by the Australian rock band You Am I